Petróleos del Perú (Petroperú), is a Peruvian state-owned company and private law dedicated to the transportation, refining, distribution and commercialization of fuels and other petroleum products. This company belonging to the Peruvian State since 1969, is considered among the main taxpayers to the treasury and currently employs more than 2,500 people. On the other hand, it makes important investments in education, health and other sustainable development projects throughout the Peruvian territory.

Among the current strategic objectives of the company are the supply of fuel to the entire Peruvian market, as well as financial sustainability and its operations, with a special emphasis on safety and care for the environment.

History

Background 

On October 9, 1968, the dictatorship of Maj General (General de Division) Juan Velasco Alvarado ordered the seizure and summary expropriation of the facilities of The International Petroleum Company (IPC), a subsidiary of Standard Oil of New Jersey, at the Talara refinery (Piura Department); carried out by General Fermín Málaga. This forced nationalisation had a huge publicity effect and helped sway public opinion in favour of the military coup, and allowed the dictatorship to consolidate its grip on power. The date was declared by military Day of National Dignity and celebrated as a public holiday until the end of the dictatorship in 1980.

Beginnings 

Petroperú was created the following year by law-decree on July 24, 1969, issued by General Juan Velasco Alvarado. The newly created company, chaired by another General, Marco Fernández-Baca Carrasco, immediately had to face the challenges of operating and maintaining the recently nationalised oil industry with local personnel and without resources or technical support from global oil players, who had been alienated by the forced nationalization of the military government.

The company and the government nevertheless had the assistance of Soviet technicians and was able to retain middle managers, surviving and even thriving despite reduced production capacity. Extraction and refining progressively increased owing to oilfield discoveries in the northern jungle (Loreto Department), association agreements that followed after Gen Velasco's deposition by another coup in 1975 and the construction of the North Peruvian Pipeline (Oleoducto Norperuano).

Currently 

During 2011, Petroperu participated in the construction of the Southern Pipeline, a project that aimed at improving the economic conditions in the south of the country. It also invested about 400 million dollars in the construction of the ethane pipeline that started in the city of Pisco, the same year.

In December 2020, the state oil company, at the special request of the Executive Branch, headed by President Francisco Sagasti, assumed the concession of the Natural Gas Distribution System by Pipeline Network of the South West Concession, for up to three years. This way, Petroperu takes over the administration of this temporary concession in order to guarantee the continuity of the provision of the public service of natural gas distribution through the pipeline network in the Arequipa, Moquegua and Tacna regions.

This assignment is assumed with full responsibility in a key period for the state company, which is in a modernization process that includes the implementation of important activities that allow it to evolve, maintaining the leadership and sustainability of the business, with transparency, and social and environmental responsibility.

In January 2021 it officially unveiled its new identity, the result of more than eight years of work in a transformation process that has resulted in a renewed and much cleaner version of the institution's image. With this change, Petroperu seeks to position itself in the Peruvian fuel market with a sustainable and competitive projection.

Also in 2021, it received authorization from the Executive Power to issue bonds worth up to $1 billion to finance the last phase of the modernization works of the Talara Refinery.

Products

Capacity 
Petroperu has a strategic importance in the provision of energy throughout the country. Its approximate refining capacity is 94,500 barrels per day (B/D), which represents 46% of Peru's total refining capacity. It is the owner of the Talara Refinery, the Conchán Refinery, the Iquitos Refinery, the El Milagro Refinery and the Pucallpa Refinery, five of the six refineries that exist throughout the national territory. It is known that it only operates four of these five refineries since the Pucallpa refinery is leased to Maple Gas and, on the other hand, the El Milagro Refinery has still been out of service since January 2015.

Derivatives 
The company has the necessary coverage to meet the national demand because it has a presence throughout the country. It has the capacity to meet the requirements of foreign companies and is a strategic supplier to the Armed Forces and National Police of Peru.

The fuels and derived products produced by Petroperu are:

Fuels 

In addition to fuels, Petroperu also offers solvents, naphthenic acid and asphalts in its list of products.

Projects

New Talara Refinery 
The Talara Refinery Modernization Project is an engineering and construction megaproject that consists of the installation of new process units and facilities aimed at improving product quality, increasing the refinery's production capacity, and implementing more complex processes. and more advanced technology. The economic and environmental benefits are as follows:

 Desulfurize fuels.
 Improve the octane number of gasoline.
 Process heavier crude oils.
 Reduce the production of residuals.
 Implement new facilities that the modernized refinery will require.
 Produce cleaner fuels.

Law for the execution of the New Talara Refinery Project - Law 30130 
On December 17, 2013, then-President Ollanta Humala promulgated Law 30130, which declared the modernization of the Talara Refinery to be of public necessity and national interest to ensure the preservation of air quality and public health. The law also indicates that measures be adopted to strengthen the Corporate Governance of Petroperu.

Lot 64 
The objective of the Project is to extract the crude oil reserves discovered in the Situche Central field, in Lot 64, located in the Loreto region.

The Project design foresees a modular execution scheme that facilitates the putting into production of the discovery wells (early production) and that allows the development of the deposit, in accordance with the confirmation of its productive potential:

 Phase A: Putting Well SC-3X into production
 Phase B: Putting Well SC-2X into production
 Phase C: Comprehensive development of the Situche Central Field

Additionally, the project includes the drilling of an exploratory well to increase the hydrocarbon reserves in the lot.

The project was planned to be developed in accordance with the terms and conditions of the Joint Investment contract signed by Petroperu S.A. and Geopark Peru S.A.C. which included an initial participation of 25% and 75% respectively. However, in July 2020, Geopark Peru S.A.C. decided to abandon Lot 64. Petroperu accepted the assignment of 75% of the additional participation, thus obtaining 100% of the rights and obligations as a contractor.

Transportation of Heavy Crudes 
Most of the oil to be transported through the North Peruvian Pipeline is classified as heavy crude (density below 20° API), so it is necessary to adapt this transportation system in order to transport said crude. The project has been called the Heavy Crude Transportation Project (PTCP).

The heavy crude from the lots located in the northern jungle of Peru will be transported by the North Branch of the ONP, from Andoas to Station 5 and from there to Bayóvar through Section II. Section I of the ONP (Station 1 - Station 5) will be used when the Perenco company transports its early production of 7 MBPD (July 2013) by river and delivers it to the ONP at Station 1 (San José de Saramuro), for its transfer to Bayovar.

ERP Modernization Project 
The areas in which ERP is being implemented are the following:

 Finance
 Commercial
 Logistics
 Maintenance
 Refinement
 Human Resources

Other refinery Projects 
The company has a feasibility study prepared by the Spanish company Fluor, for a future modernization of the Iquitos Refinery. It has also formed a Task-Force team to formulate a medium-term project for the modernization of the Conchán Refinery, another of its refineries located south of Lima. It will also explore lot 192, in which it is looking for partners.

Modernize Petroperu 
In December 2013, at a press conference, the then head of the Ministry of Economy and Finance, Luis Miguel Castilla, pointed out that the modernization project for the Talara Refinery is part of “a much larger initiative” to modernize Petroperu. "The approved bill, which will be sent to Congress for debate and approval, includes an administrative and business unit reorganization, which will ensure the financial reorganization and sustainability of the company's operations," he said. It also includes a very aggressive plan to "install good corporate governance practices," as the main oil companies in the world have. Also, the modernization plan includes a strategy to open the company's capital to private partners, up to 49%, and to be listed on the Stock Exchange, a target for the following months and years. "Another part of the company's share package within the 49% that will be offered on the stock market will be destined to a citizen participation program," he announced. Castilla emphasizes that the incorporation of private capital "is essential" to modernize and accelerate better management processes within the company.

New infrastructure 
For his part, the president of Petroperu in that period, Héctor Reyes Cruz, believes that the modernization includes building a new complex to put aside the current infrastructure of the Piura refinery. “There are nine industrial plants, plus auxiliary plants, which add up to 15 new plants at the Talara refinery. The plants that are currently operating will be out of service”, he mentioned. Similarly, he stressed that the project is about "the new Talara refinery", which will remove the sulfur content from fuels to make them more friendly to the health and environment of Peruvians. The new refinery will produce high-octane gasoline, will be able to process heavier crude oils and the investment made will benefit the Piura region and the entire country. "This project generates flows that by themselves pay for the project in all its context and, furthermore, it is part of the modernization of Petróleos del Perú," he points out.

Currently, Petroperú is close to completing the last phase of the Talara Refinery modernization project. For this last phase, it requires 700 million dollars, which will be obtained with the issuance of bonds worth up to 1 billion dollars. This is thanks to the fact that it received approval to issue them from the government. However, it is known that this debt issuance will not be endorsed by the Executive. Thanks to this new effort, the refinery, which is close to 93% under construction, is expected to expand its crude oil refining capacity from 65,000 to 95,000 barrels per day.

Organization 
The company is constituted as follows:

 Board
 General Management
 General Secretary
 Institutional Control Body
 Internal Audit and Risks
 Administration and Finance Management
 Management Planning and Management
 Legal Management
 Communications Department Management
 Social Management Management
 Environment, Safety and Occupational Health Management
 People Management Management
 Talara Refinery Management
 Operations Management
 Commercial Management
 Supply Chain Management
 Innovation, Development and New Business Management
 Natural Gas Management

Chairmen of the Board 

 Marco Fernández Baca (1972-1975)
 Máximo León-Velarde (1975-1976)
 César Augusto Freitas (1976-1978)
 Víctor López Mendoza (1978)
 Julio Dávila Valeriano (1978-1980)
 Víctor Montori Alfaro (1980-1982)
 Juan F. Cassabone Rasselet (1982-1984)
 Alfredo Zúñiga y Rivero (1984-1985)
 Alfredo Carranza Guevara (1985-1986)
 Jaysuño Abramovich Schwartzberg (1986-1989)
 Daniel Núñez Castillo (1989-1990)
 Jaime Quijandría Salmón (1990-1992)
 Emilio Zúñiga Castillo (1993-1995)
 Alberto Pandolfi Arbulú (1995-1996)
 Armando Echeandía Luna (1996)
 Jorge Kawamura Antich (1996-2000)
 Alejandro Narváez Liceras (2003-2005)
 Róger Arévalo Ramírez (2005-2006)
 César Gutiérrez Peña (2006-2008)
 Luis Rebolledo Soberón (2009-2011)
 Humberto Campodónico Sánchez (2011-2012)
 Héctor Reyes Cruz (2013-2014)
 Pedro Touzzet Gianello (2014-2015)
 Germán Velásquez (2015-2016)
 Luis Eduardo García-Rosell Artola (2016-2018)
 James Atkins Lerggios (2018-2019)
 Carlos Paredes Lanatta (2019-2020)
 Eduardo Alfredo Guevara Dodds (2020 to date)

Logo 

As part of its renewal process, Petroperu embarked on an identity change that took more than eight years. The company decided to replace the Huacal, a pre-Inca religious funerary mask, which was part of the previous isotype, with the letter P, an acronym for oil and Peru, which now becomes the new face of the company. The isotype is clad in the colors green, white, red and light blue. On the other hand, the new slogan of the state company is "Getting the best for Peru".

Petroperu Building 

The Petroperu Building is a building located in the San Isidro district, in the city of Lima. Created by the architects Walter Weberhofer and Daniel Arana Ríos, its design -made in 1969- follows an architectural style known as "Brutalism" and was inaugurated in 1973.

Slogans 

 1973-90s: Symbol of Peruvian Identity
 1990s: Improving Quality of Life
 2010-2012: The Energy that Moves your World
 2014: Growing together with all Peruvians
 2014-2020: The energy that Moves Us
 Currently: Getting the best for Peru

See also 

List of petroleum companies

References

External links
 Petroperu official site

Oil and gas companies of Peru
National oil and gas companies
Energy companies established in 1969
Non-renewable resource companies established in 1969
Peruvian brands
Government-owned companies of Peru